Temple Beth Sholom is the largest and oldest Reform Synagogue on Miami Beach, Florida, with 1210 member households. Temple Beth Sholom is a member of the Union for Reform Judaism .

Founding
The Beth Sholom Jewish Center was started by Abraham Zinnamon and Benjamin Appel. After seeing a Yiddish newspaper in Appel's hands, Zinnamon approached him with the idea of forming a Jewish Center. They put together a group of people for the first founders' meeting of Beth Sholom Center, which took place on April 6, 1942. On June 3 of that same year, a building at 761 41st Street was leased.

A charter of the State of Florida was granted shortly thereafter. Rabbi Samuel Machtai, the "Radio Rabbi", conducted the first High Holy Days Services in 1942. The service was held in a storefront, where 20 Miami Beach Jewish families gathered to provide a house of worship for themselves and for Jewish servicemen.   

Two years later, the Beth Sholom Jewish Center decided to hire a full-time rabbi. On August 9, 1944, at the 36th meeting of the board of directors, held in the home of its chairman, Charles Tobin, it was decided to employ Rabbi Leon Kronish to serve as the center's spiritual leader. Rabbi Kronish was installed by Rabbi Stephen Samuel Wise, President of New York's Jewish Institute of Religion, in the North Beach Elementary School auditorium.

To begin to build a Congregation, Rabbi Kronish went from house to house knocking on doors and wherever he saw a mezuzah, he invited the family to join the new synagogue. On April 24, 1945, the by-laws were changed and a resolution was passed to amend the Charter of Beth Sholom Center, to rename the nonprofit organization Temple Beth Sholom.

Expansions
The second home of Temple Beth Sholom was a two-story, dilapidated house called the Chase Avenue Hotel at 4141 Chase Avenue. The growing congregation acquired the building and had it remodeled. The membership grew from 40 households to more than 750 by 1955 and by the late 1960s included more than 1200 families. 

In 1956, the temple sanctuary and banquet hall were designed by Jewish American architect Percival Goodman and built. In 1961, the religious school and auditorium were added. 

In 1967 Temple Beth Sholom began its development as a cultural center for the Greater Miami Area, in keeping with Rabbi Kronish's vision of the Temple as a place for community as well as worship. In 1969, Rabbi Harry Jolt, zecher tzadik livracha, who had recently retired from his pulpit in Ventnor, New Jersey, was asked by Rabbi Kronish to become Auxiliary Rabbi and assist in the cultural and adult education programs of the Temple. His death, at age 97, was a deep loss for the congregation.

In 1984, the school was refurbished and the administrative wing was completed. In 2003, the school building was refurbished once again. A new two story facility recently completed includes a: Youth Center, offices, Chapel, Welcome Center, classrooms, meeting spaces and art gallery. The Temple is also surrounded by outdoor spaces including play areas, meditation garden and palm plaza.

The Temple Beth Sholom buildings and campus has grown, from  the 1940s "laundry−horse stable" building, to the present complex at the corner of Chase Avenue and Arthur Godfrey Road in Miami Beach.

Rabbi Kronish legacy
Rabbi Kronish's loving devotion to the State of Israel was exemplified through his involvement in Jewish Federation, Histadrut, American Jewish Congress and the Israel Bonds National Leadership. He was one of the leaders in World Jewry and with his family's move from Poland, a first generation American Jew.  The Confirmation Class has journeyed on a pilgrimage to Israel every year, a program that Rabbi Kronish initiated. Reaching beyond Jewish borders, the Congregation has also been deeply involved in the civil rights movement and in fighting world hunger. Rabbi Kronish's death in 1996 officially ended the first era of Temple Beth Sholom's history.

Recent history

In 1985, the temple engaged Gary Glickstein, a young scholar who had served as rabbi of Temple Sinai in Worcester, Massachusetts since 1977 to serve as Senior Rabbi. Rabbi Glickstein's serves on the advisory board of the Greater Miami Coalition for a Drug Free Community, was past Chairman of the President's Advisory Committee on Jewish Studies at Barry University, and has served as vice chairman of the Miami Mission 1000 and Mega Mission Two. He is a past President of the Rabbinic Association of Greater Miami. Nationally, he was Chairman of the UJA National Rabbinic Cabinet, past Chair of the National Rabbinic Cabinet of Israel Bonds and past Treasurer of the Central Conference of American Rabbis.  He is presently Co-Chair of the Synagogue/Federation Relations Committee of the Greater Miami Jewish Federation.

Senior Rabbis

Gayle Pomerantz served as Associate Rabbi from 1994 to 2018.

Associate/Auxiliary Rabbis

Cantors

References

External links
Temple Beth Sholom website
North Beach Elementary School website
Center for Jewish History.org: Leon Kronish Papers (P-990)  — in the American Jewish Historical Society archives (NY, NY).

Synagogues in Miami Beach, Florida
Reform synagogues in Florida
Ashkenazi synagogues
Ashkenazi Jewish culture in Florida
Jewish day schools in Florida
Reform Jewish day schools
Jewish organizations established in 1942
1942 establishments in Florida
1956 establishments in Florida
Synagogues completed in 1956
Percival Goodman synagogues